Fernando Arturo Patterson Castro (born 15 March 1970 in Costa Rica) is a Costa Rican former football goalkeeper who finished his career at Xelajú in Guatemala's top division.

He is a naturalized citizen of Guatemala.

Club career
Born in La Francia de Siquirres, Patterson has spent part of his playing career in Costa Rica, but he has spent most of it in Guatemala with Xelajú.

He made his debut in 1989 at Limonense and played 113 matches, scoring three goals when also deployed as a striker, for Limonense, Turrialba and Puntarenas, before moving abroad to play in Guatemala with Xelajú and Cobán Imperial. He joined Cartaginés in January 2002 and moved to Ramonense in 2003. In summer 2004, Patterson returned to Xelajú.

He signed for San Carlos in January 2008 from Guatemalan side Xelajú, only for him to disappear from the club three weeks later. He ended up playing in Guatemala again for Heredia Jaguares. He signed again for Xelaju from Heredia in June 2009. In May 2011 he returned for another spell at Xela after a season at Xinabajul, only to send him to Coatepeque for the 2011 Apertura season. He returned to playing for Xelajú in 2012 and saved three penalties in the 2012 Clausura final against Municipal for Xelajú to clinch the league title and Pattersons third title with the club after 1996 and 2007.

Patterson retired in June 2013, at 43 years of age.

Goalscoring
As of April 2007, he had scored 24 league goals and two in the Guatemalan Cup. In November 2009, he was ranked 8th of goalkeepers who had scored most goals by the IFFHS with 28 goals in total and in February 2013 he ranked 7th with 35 goals.

International career
Patterson made his debut for Costa Rica in a July 1993 CONCACAF Gold Cup third place match against Jamaica. The game proved to be his only cap since he never played again for the Ticos.

References

External links 
 
 Player profile - Xelaju
 

1970 births
Living people
People from Limón Province
Naturalized citizens of Guatemala
Costa Rican emigrants to Guatemala
Association football goalkeepers
Costa Rican footballers
Costa Rica international footballers
Guatemalan footballers
Puntarenas F.C. players
Cobán Imperial players
A.D. Ramonense players
Xelajú MC players
C.S. Cartaginés players
A.D. San Carlos footballers
Costa Rican expatriate footballers
Expatriate footballers in Guatemala
1993 CONCACAF Gold Cup players